Philippe Boisse (born 18 March 1955) is a French fencer. He won a gold medal in the team épée event at the 1980 Summer Olympics and the individual épée at the 1984 Summer Olympics. He also won a silver in the team épée in 1984.

He is currently a vice-president of the French Fencing Federation, and a practicing physician (radiology).

He is the father of Érik Boisse, a 2004 Olympics gold medal winner in men's team épée.

References

1955 births
Living people
French male épée fencers
Olympic fencers of France
Fencers at the 1976 Summer Olympics
Fencers at the 1980 Summer Olympics
Fencers at the 1984 Summer Olympics
Olympic gold medalists for France
Olympic silver medalists for France
Olympic medalists in fencing
Medalists at the 1980 Summer Olympics
Medalists at the 1984 Summer Olympics
20th-century French people